The Koh-i-Noor (from ), also spelled Kohinoor and Koh-i-Nur, is one of the largest cut diamonds in the world, weighing . It is part of the Crown Jewels of the United Kingdom. The diamond is currently set in the Crown of Queen Elizabeth The Queen Mother.

There are multiple conflicting legends on the origin of the diamond. However, in the words of the colonial administrator Theo Metcalfe, there is "very meagre and imperfect" evidence of the early history of the Koh-i-Noor before the 1740s that can directly tie it to any ancient diamond. There is no record of its original weight, but the earliest attested weight is 186 old carats (191 metric carats or 38.2 g). The first verifiable record of the diamond comes from a history by Muhammad Kazim Marvi of the 1740s invasion of Northern India by Nader Shah. Marvi notes that the Koh-i-Noor as being one of many stones on the Mughal Peacock Throne that Nader Shah looted from Delhi. The diamond then changed hands between various empires in south and west Asia, until being given to Queen Victoria after the British East India Company's annexation of the Punjab in 1849, during the reign of the then 11-year-old Maharaja of the Sikh Empire Duleep Singh, who ruled under the shadow influence of the Company ally Gulab Singh, the first Maharaja of Jammu and Kashmir, who had previously possessed the stone.

Originally, the stone was of a similar cut to other Mughal-era diamonds, like the Daria-i-Noor, which are now in the Iranian Crown Jewels. In 1851, it went on display at the Great Exhibition in London, but the lackluster cut failed to impress viewers. Prince Albert, husband of Queen Victoria, ordered it to be re-cut as an oval brilliant by Coster Diamonds. By modern standards, the culet (point at the bottom of a gemstone) is unusually broad, giving the impression of a black hole when the stone is viewed head-on; it is nevertheless regarded by gemologists as "full of life".

Since arriving in the UK, it has only been worn by female members of the family. Victoria wore the stone in a brooch and a circlet. After she died in 1901, it was set in the Crown of Queen Alexandra. It was transferred to the Crown of Queen Mary in 1911, and finally to the Crown of Queen Elizabeth The Queen Mother in 1937 for her coronation.

Today, the diamond is on public display in the Jewel House at the Tower of London. The governments of India, Iran, Pakistan, and Afghanistan, as well as the Taliban, have all claimed ownership of the Koh-i-Noor, demanding its return ever since India gained independence from the British Empire in 1947. The British government insists the gem was obtained legally under the terms of the Last Treaty of Lahore and has rejected the claims.

History

Legendary origin 
It was said to have been fixed as the left eye of the murti of the Hindu goddess Bhadrakali in the Bhadrakali Temple in Warangal by the Kakatiya dynasty who regarded the deity as their kuldevi. Babur, the Turco-Mongol founder of the Mughal Empire, wrote about a "famous" diamond that weighed just over 187 old carats – approximately the size of the 186-carat Koh-i-Noor. According to his diary it was acquired by Alauddin Khalji of the Khalji dynasty of the Delhi Sultanate, when he invaded the kingdoms of southern India at the beginning of the 14th century and looted it from the Kakatiyas. It later passed on to succeeding dynasties of the Sultanate, and Babur received the diamond in 1526 as a tribute for his conquest of Delhi and Agra at the Battle of Panipat. However, it is impossible to verify these details exactly about when or where it was found, and many competing theories exist as to its original owner.

For this carelessness, Borgia was reprimanded and fined 10,000 rupees. However according to recent research, the story of Borgia cutting the diamond is not correct, and most probably mixed up with that of the Orlov, part of Catherine the Great's imperial Russian scepter in the Kremlin.

Early history 

In early Indian history, diamonds were the most valued of gemstones. However, during the period of Mughal rule, diamonds lost this distinction. When looking at the Mughal treasury, Abu'l-Fazl ibn Mubarak, the Grand vizier to Akbar, noted that red spinels and Burmese rubies had become the most desirable jewels by the nobility. During this time the Persian new year ceremony, Nowruz, had become a period in which the subjects could bring offerings of gems and money to the imperial family in exchange for political promotions within the greater bureaucracy. By the time Shah Jahan ascended the throne as the fifth Mughal emperor, there were so many jewels in the treasury that he decided to use many of them in the making of the ornate Peacock Throne in 1635.

Over a century later in 1738 Nader Shah, founder of the Afsharid dynasty, following the overthrow of the Safavid dynasty of Persia two years earlier began raiding into Mughal territory before soon launching a full-scale invasion of India. This invading force soon captured Delhi, where after a massacre of the civilian population the army began a systematic looting of the wealth of the city and the treasury of the Mughal Empire. With nearly 10,000 wagons of loot, along with millions of rupees and an assortment of other historic jewels, Nader Shah also carried away the imperial Peacock Throne. And it is here on the head of one of the peacocks on the throne that Nader Shah's biographer Muhammad Kazim Marvi first records seeing the Koh-i-Noor in the 1740s along with other prominent gems, such as the great Timur Ruby and the Daria-i-Noor. It is alleged that Nader Shah exclaimed "Koh-i-Noor!", Persian and Hindi-Urdu for "Mountain of Light", when he first obtained the famous stone. One of his consorts is even noted to have said, "If a strong man were to throw four stones – one north, one south, one east, one west, and a fifth stone up into the air – and if the space between them were to be filled with gold, all would not equal the value of the Koh-i-Noor".

After Nadir Shah was killed and his empire collapsed in 1747, the Koh-i-Noor fell to his grandson, who in 1751 gave it to Ahmad Shah Durrani, founder of the Afghan Empire, in return for his support. One of Ahmed's grandsons, Shuja Shah Durrani, wore a bracelet containing the Koh-i-Noor on the occasion of Mountstuart Elphinstone's visit to Peshawar in 1808. A year later, Shah Shuja formed an alliance with the United Kingdom to help defend against a possible invasion of Afghanistan by Russia. He was quickly overthrown, but fled with the diamond to Lahore (in modern Pakistan), where Ranjit Singh, founder of the Sikh Empire, in return for his hospitality, insisted upon the gem being given to him, and he took possession of it in 1813.

In Ranjit Singh's possession 
Ranjit Singh had the diamond examined by jewelers of Lahore for two days to ensure that Shuja had not tricked him. After the jewelers confirmed its genuineness, he donated 125,000 rupees to Shuja. Ranjit Singh then asked the principal jewelers of Amritsar to estimate the diamond's value; the jewelers declared that the value of the diamond was "far beyond all computation". Ranjit Singh then affixed the diamond to the front of his turban, and paraded on an elephant to enable his subjects to see it. He used to wear it as an armlet during major festivals such as Diwali and Dusserah, and took it with him during travel. He would exhibit it to prominent visitors, especially British officers.

One day, Ranjit Singh asked the diamond's former owners – Shuja and his wife Wafa Begum – to estimate its value. Wafa Begum replied that if a strong man threw a stone in four cardinal directions and vertically, Koh-i-Noor would be worth more than the gold and precious stones filled in the space. Ranjit Singh grew paranoid about the Koh-i-Noor being stolen, because in the past, another valuable jewel had been stolen from him while he was intoxicated. He kept the diamond within a high-security facility at the Gobindgarh Fort when it was not in use. When the diamond was to be transported, it was placed in a pannier on a guarded camel; 39 other camels with identical panniers were included in the convoy; the diamond was always placed on the first camel immediately behind the guards, but great secrecy was maintained regarding which camel carried it. Only Ranjit Singh's treasurer Misr Beli Ram knew which camel carried the diamond.

In June 1839, Ranjit Singh suffered his third stroke, and it became apparent that he would die soon. On his deathbed, he started giving away his valuable possessions to religious charities, and appointed his eldest son Kharak Singh as his successor. A day before his death, on 26 June 1839, a major argument broke out between his courtiers regarding the fate of Koh-i-Noor. Ranjit Singh himself was too weak to speak, and communicated using gestures. Bhai Gobind Ram, the head Brahmin of Ranjit Singh, insisted that the king had willed Koh-i-Noor and other jewels to the Jagannath Temple in Puri: the king apparently supported this claim through gestures, as recorded in his court chronicle Umdat ul-Tawarikh. However, treasurer Beli Ram insisted that it was a state property rather than Ranjit Singh's personal property, and therefore, should be handed over to Kharak Singh.

After Ranjit Singh's death, Beli Ram refused to send the diamond to the temple, and hid it in his vaults. Meanwhile, Kharak Singh and wazir Dhian Singh also issued orders stating that the diamond should not be taken out of Lahore.

In Gulab Singh's possession 

On 8 October 1839, the new emperor Kharak Singh was overthrown in a coup by his prime minister Dhian Singh. The prime minister's brother Gulab Singh, Raja of Jammu, came into possession of the Koh-i-Noor. Kharak Singh later died in prison, soon followed by the mysterious death of his son and successor Nau Nihal Singh on 5 November 1840. Gulab Singh held onto the stone until January 1841, when he presented it to emperor Sher Singh in order to win his favour, after his brother Dhian Singh negotiated a ceasefire between Sher Singh and the overthrown empress Chand Kaur. Gulab Singh had attempted to defend the widowed empress at her fort in Lahore, during two days of conflict and shelling by Sher Singh and his troops. Despite handing over the Koh-i-noor, Gulab Singh as a result of the ceasefire returned safely to Jammu with a wealth of gold and other jewels taken from the treasury.

Worn by child emperor Duleep Singh 
On 15 September 1843, both Sher Singh and prime minister Dhian Singh were assassinated in a coup led by Ajit Singh Sandhawalia. However, the next day in a counter coup led by Dhian's son Hira Singh the assassins were killed. Aged 24, Hira Singh succeeded his father as prime minister, and installed the five-year old Duleep Singh as emperor. The Koh-i-noor was now fastened to the arm of the child emperor in court at Lahore. Duleep Singh and his mother empress Jind Kaur, had till then resided in Jammu, the kingdom governed by Gulab Singh.

Following his nephew Prime Minister Hira Singh's assassination on 27 March 1844, and the subsequent outbreak of the First Anglo-Sikh War, Gulab Singh himself led the Sikh empire as its prime minister, and despite defeat in the war, he became the first Maharaja of Jammu and Kashmir on 16 March 1846, under the Treaty of Amritsar.

Acquisition by Queen Victoria 

On 29 March 1849, following the conclusion of the Second Anglo-Sikh War, the Kingdom of Punjab was formally annexed to Company rule, and the Last Treaty of Lahore was signed, officially ceding the Koh-i-Noor to Queen Victoria and the Maharaja's other assets to the company. Article III of the treaty read:

The lead signatory of the treaty for the by then eleven-year-old Maharaja Duleep Singh was his commander-in-chief Tej Singh, a loyalist of Maharaja Gulab Singh who had previously been in possession of the Koh-i-Noor and gained Kashmir from the Sikh empire, via treaty with Britain, following the First Anglo-Sikh War.

The Governor-General in charge of the ratification of this treaty was the Marquess of Dalhousie. The manner of his aiding in the transfer of the diamond was criticized even by some of his contemporaries in Britain. Although some thought it should have been presented as a gift to Queen Victoria by the East India Company, it is clear that Dalhousie believed the stone was a spoil of war, and treated it accordingly, ensuring that it was officially surrendered to her by Duleep Singh, the youngest son of Ranjit Singh. The presentation of the Koh-i-Noor by the East India Company to the queen was the latest in a long history of transfers of the diamond as a coveted spoil of war. Duleep Singh had been placed in the guardianship of Dr John Login, a surgeon in the British Army serving in the Presidency of Bengal. Duleep Singh moved to England in 1854 and spent the rest of his life in exile.

Journey to the United Kingdom 

In due course, the Governor-General received the Koh-i-Noor from Dr Login, who had been appointed Governor of the Citadel, on 6 April 1848 under a receipt dated 7 December 1849, in the presence of members of the Board of Administration for the affairs of the Punjab: Sir Henry Lawrence (President), C. G. Mansel, John Lawrence and Sir Henry Elliot (Secretary to the Government of India).

Legend in the Lawrence family has it that before the voyage, John Lawrence left the jewel in his waistcoat pocket when it was sent to be laundered, and was most grateful when it was returned promptly by the valet who found it.

On 1 February 1850, the jewel was sealed in a small iron safe inside a red dispatch box, both sealed with red tape and a wax seal and kept in a chest at Bombay Treasury awaiting a steamer ship from China. It was then sent to England for presentation to Queen Victoria in the care of Captain J. Ramsay and Brevet Lt. Col F. Mackeson under tight security arrangements, one of which was the placement of the dispatch box in a larger iron safe. They departed from Bombay on 6 April on board HMS Medea, captained by Captain Lockyer.

The ship had a difficult voyage: an outbreak of cholera on board when the ship was in Mauritius had the locals demanding its departure, and they asked their governor to open fire on the vessel and destroy it if there was no response. Shortly afterwards, the vessel was hit by a severe gale that blew for some 12 hours.

On arrival in Britain on 29 June, the passengers and mail were unloaded in Plymouth, but the Koh-i-Noor stayed on board until the ship reached Spithead, near Portsmouth, on 1 July. The next morning, Ramsay and Mackeson, in the company of Mr Onslow, the private secretary to the Chairman of the Court of Directors of the British East India Company, proceeded by train to East India House in the City of London and passed the diamond into the care of the chairman and deputy chairman of the East India Company.

The Koh-i-Noor was formally presented to Queen Victoria on 3 July 1850 at Buckingham Palace by the deputy chairman of the East India Company. The date had been chosen to coincide with the Company's 250th anniversary.

The Great Exhibition 

Members of the public were given a chance to see the Koh-i-Noor when The Great Exhibition was staged at Hyde Park, London, in 1851. It represented the might of the British Empire and took pride of place in the eastern part of the central gallery.

Its mysterious past and advertised value of £1–2 million drew large crowds. At first, the stone was put inside a gilded birdcage, but after complaints about its dull appearance, the Koh-i-Noor was moved to a case with black velvet and gas lamps in the hope that it would sparkle better. Despite this, the flawed and asymmetrical diamond still failed to please viewers.

1852 re-cutting 
It was high-domed, with a flat base and both triangular and rectangular facets, similar in overall appearance to other Mughal-era diamonds which are now in the Iranian Crown Jewels.

Disappointment in the appearance of the stone was not uncommon. After consulting mineralogists, including Sir David Brewster, it was decided by Prince Albert, the husband of Queen Victoria, with the consent of the government, to polish the Koh-i-Noor. One of the largest and most famous Dutch diamond merchants, Mozes Coster, was employed for the task. He sent to London one of his most experienced artisans, Levie Benjamin Voorzanger, and his assistants.

On 17 July 1852, the cutting began at the factory of Garrard & Co. in Haymarket, using a steam-powered mill built specially for the job by Maudslay, Sons and Field. Under the supervision of Prince Albert and the Duke of Wellington, and the technical direction of the queen's mineralogist, James Tennant, the cutting took thirty-eight days. Albert spent a total of £8,000 on the operation, which reduced the weight of the diamond from 186 old carats (191 modern carats or 38.2 g) to its current . Brilliant-cut diamonds usually have fifty-eight facets, but the Koh-i-Noor has eight additional "star" facets around the culet, making a total of sixty-six facets.

The great loss of weight is to some extent accounted for by the fact that Voorzanger discovered several flaws, one especially big, that he found necessary to cut away. Although Prince Albert was dissatisfied with such a huge reduction, most experts agreed that Voorzanger had made the right decision and carried out his job with impeccable skill. When Queen Victoria showed the re-cut diamond to the young Maharaja Duleep Singh, the Koh-i-Noor's last non-British owner, he was apparently unable to speak for several minutes afterwards.

The much lighter but more dazzling stone was mounted in a honeysuckle brooch and a circlet worn by the queen. At this time, it belonged to her personally, and was not yet part of the Crown Jewels. Although Victoria wore it often, she became uneasy about the way in which the diamond had been acquired. In a letter to her eldest daughter, Victoria, Princess Royal, she wrote in the 1870s: "No one feels more strongly than I do about India or how much I opposed our taking those countries and I think no more will be taken, for it is very wrong and no advantage to us. You know also how I dislike wearing the Koh-i-Noor".

Crown Jewel 

After Queen Victoria's death, the Koh-i-Noor was set in the Crown of Queen Alexandra, the wife of Edward VII, that was used to crown her at their coronation in 1902. The diamond was transferred to Queen Mary's Crown in 1911, and finally to The Queen Mother's Crown in 1937. When the Queen Mother died in 2002, the crown was placed on top of her coffin for the lying-in-state and funeral. Camilla, Queen Consort, is set to be crowned with Queen Mary's Crown at the coronation of King Charles III on 6 May 2023, but without the Koh-i-Noor diamond.

All these crowns are on display in the Jewel House at the Tower of London with crystal replicas of the diamond set in the older crowns. The original bracelet given to Queen Victoria can also be seen there. A glass model of the Koh-i-Noor shows visitors how it looked when it was brought to the United Kingdom. Replicas of the diamond in this and its re-cut forms can also be seen in the 'Vault' exhibit at the Natural History Museum in London.

During the Second World War, the Crown Jewels were moved from their home at the Tower of London to Windsor Castle. They were kept in leather hat boxes under lock and key in the office of the Royal Librarian Sir Owen Morshead until 1941 when they were transferred to a specially dug tunnel under the walls of the castle. At this time Morshead and the Keeper of the Tower Armouries removed some of the larger stones, including the Koh-i-Noor, and wrapping them in cotton wool, inserted them in a glass preserving-jar, which was then placed in a biscuit tin; the thinking being that, unlike the bulkier crowns, this would allow their swift relocation if the German invasion occurred.

Ownership dispute 
The Koh-i-Noor has long been a subject of diplomatic controversy, with India, Pakistan, Iran, and Afghanistan all demanding its return from the UK at various points.

India 
The Government of India first demanded the return of the Koh-i-Noor as soon as independence was granted in 1947. A second request followed in 1953, the year of the coronation of Queen Elizabeth II. Each time, the British Government rejected the claims, saying that ownership was non-negotiable.

In 2000, several members of the Indian Parliament signed a letter calling for the diamond to be given back to India, claiming it was taken illegally. British officials said that a variety of claims meant it was impossible to establish the diamond's original owner, and that it had been part of Britain's heritage for more than 150 years.

In July 2010, while visiting India, David Cameron, the prime minister of the United Kingdom, said of returning the diamond, "If you say yes to one you suddenly find the British Museum would be empty. I am afraid to say, it is going to have to stay put." On a subsequent visit in February 2013, he said, "They're not having that back."

In April 2016, the Indian Culture Ministry stated it would make "all possible efforts" to arrange the return of the Koh-i-Noor to India. The then solicitor general of India, Ranjit Kumar said, "It was given voluntarily by Ranjit Singh to the British as compensation for help in the Sikh Wars. The Koh-i-Noor is not a stolen object."

Pakistan 
In 1976, Pakistan asserted its ownership of the diamond, saying its return would be "a convincing demonstration of the spirit that moved Britain voluntarily to shed its imperial encumbrances and lead the process of decolonisation". In a letter to the prime minister of Pakistan, Zulfikar Ali Bhutto, the prime minister of the United Kingdom, James Callaghan, wrote, "I need not remind you of the various hands through which the stone has passed over the past two centuries, nor that explicit provision for its transfer to the British crown was made in the peace treaty with the Maharajah of the Sikh Empire in 1849. I could not advise Her Majesty that it should be surrendered."

Afghanistan 
In 2000, the Taliban's foreign affairs spokesman, Faiz Ahmed Faiz, said the Koh-i-Noor was the legitimate property of Afghanistan, and demanded for it to be handed over to the regime. "The history of the diamond shows it was taken from us (Afghanistan) to India, and from there to Britain. We have a much better claim than the Indians", he said. The Afghan claim derives from Shah Shuja Durrani's memoirs, which states he surrendered the diamond to Ranjit Singh while Singh was having his son tortured in front of him, so he argued that the Maharajah of Lahore acquired the stone illegitimately.

Possible compromises
Because of the quadripartite dispute over the diamond's rightful ownership, there have been various compromises suggested to bring the dispute to an end. These include dividing it into four, with a piece given to each of Afghanistan, India, and Pakistan, with the final piece retained by the British Crown. Another suggestion is that the jewel be housed in a special museum at the Wagah border between India and Pakistan. However this suggestion does not cater to Afghan claims, nor the reality of current British possession. The British Government rejects these compromises, and has stated since the end of the British Raj that the status of the diamond is 'non-negotiable'.

In popular culture 
The Koh-i-Noor was one of the inspirations for the eponymous gemstone in The Moonstone (1868), a 19th-century British epistolary novel by Wilkie Collins, generally considered to be the first full length detective novel in the English language. In his preface to the first edition of the book, Collins says that he based his eponymous "Moonstone" on the histories of two stones: the Orlov, a  diamond in the Russian Imperial Sceptre, and the Koh-i-Noor. In the 1966 Penguin Books edition of The Moonstone, J. I. M. Stewart states that Collins used G. C. King's The Natural History, Ancient and Modern, of Precious Stones ... (1865) to research the history of the Koh-i-Noor.

The Koh-i-Noor also features in Agatha Christie's 1925 detective novel The Secret of Chimneys where it is hidden somewhere inside a large country house and is discovered at the end of the novel. The diamond had been stolen from the Tower of London by a Parisian gang leader who replaced it with a replica stone.

The Koh-i-Noor is a central plot point in George MacDonald Fraser's 1990 historical novel and satire, Flashman and the Mountain of Light, which refers to the diamond in its title.

Kohinoor, a 2005 Indian mystery television series follows a search for the diamond after its supposed return to India. 

The Koh-i-Noor is a main part of the 2014 Indian film Bang Bang!. 

Kolkatay Kohinoor, a 2019 mystery thriller film is based on a similar premise and explores the diamond's fictional relations to Kolkata.

See also 

 Daria-i-Noor
 Golconda Diamonds
 List of diamonds
 List of largest rough diamonds

Notes

References

Bibliography

Further reading
 Shipley, Robert M. (1939) Important Diamonds of the World, pp.  5-8. Gemological Institute of America, USA, Vol. 3, No. 4 (Winter 1939)
 Shipley, Robert M. (1943) Diamond Glossary, pp.  119 (PDF page 11) Gemological Institute of America, USA, Vol. 4, No. 8 (Winter 1943)

External links 

 

1739 in Asia
Crown Jewels of the United Kingdom
Golconda diamonds
Jewels of the Mughal Empire
History of Andhra Pradesh
History of India
Individual diamonds
Persian words and phrases
Sikh Empire